The cycling competitions at the 2017 Southeast Asian Games in Kuala Lumpur will take place at Nilai and Putrajaya.

The 2017 Games will feature competitions in twenty events (men 12 events and women 8 events).\

Men's BMX

Seeding run

Semi-finals

Heat 1

Heat 2

Final

Women's BMX

Seeding run

Semi-finals

Heat 1

Heat 2

Final

Men's criterium

Final

Women's criterium

Final

Men's team road time trial

Final

Men's road race

Final

Women's road race

Final

Men's Keirin

First round

Heat 1

Heat 2

Final

Women's Keirin

Final

Men's Omnium

Overall results

Event results

Scratch race

Individual pursuit

Elimination race

Time trial

Flying lap

Points race

Women's Omnium

Overall results

Event results

Scratch race

Individual pursuit

Elimination race

Time trial

Flying lap

Points race

Men's pursuit

First round

Finals

Men's team pursuit

First round

Finals

Women's team pursuit

First round

Finals

Men's sprint

First round

Quarter-finals

Semi-finals

Heat 1

Heat 2

Finals
Bronze medal match

Gold medal match

Women's sprint

First round

Quarter-finals

Semi-finals

Heat 1

Heat 2

Finals
Bronze medal match

Gold medal match

Men's team sprint

First round

Finals

Women's team sprint

First round

Finals

Men's time trial

Final

Women's time trial

Final

References

External links
  

R